Senator Clay may refer to:

Members of the United States Senate
Alexander S. Clay (1853–1910), U.S. Senator from Georgia from 1897 to 1910
Clement Claiborne Clay (1816–1882), U.S. Senator from Alabama from 1853 to 1861; Confederate States Senator from Alabama from 1862 to 1864
Clement Comer Clay (1789–1866), U.S. Senator from Alabama from 1837 to 1841
Henry Clay (1777–1852), U.S. Senator from Kentucky from 1849 to 1852

United States state senate members
Eugene Herbert Clay (1881–1923), Georgia State Senate
Green Clay (1757–1826), Kentucky State Senate
James Franklin Clay (1840–1921), Kentucky State Senate
Lacy Clay (born 1956), Missouri State Senate
Rudolph M. Clay (1935–2013), Indiana State Senate